Averkiyev (masculine) or Averkiyeva (feminine) is a Russian last name. Variants of this last name include Averin/Averina (/) and Averyanov/Averyanova (/).

They all derive from the Russian male first name Averky (or its derivative forms Avera and Averyan), which used to be common in the past. The name supposedly derives from a Latin verb meaning to put to flight. The following people share this last name:
Alexander Averkiyev (1980–2000), Russian private, a Hero of the Russian Federation
Dmitry Averkiyev (1836–1905), Russian playwright and novelist
Julia Averkieva (Yuliya Averkiyeva) (1907–1980), Soviet anthropologist and string figure collector

See also
Averkiyevo, several rural localities in Russia

References

Notes

Sources
Ю. А. Федосюк (Yu. A. Fedosyuk). "Русские фамилии: популярный этимологический словарь" (Russian Last Names: a Popular Etymological Dictionary). Москва, 2006. 



Russian-language surnames